Trịnh Quang Vinh (born 17 March 1988) is a Vietnamese footballer who plays as a forward for V.League 2 club Phố Hiến

Honours

Club
Becamex Bình Dương
 V.League 1: 2014, 2015
 Vietnamese National Cup: 2015
 Vietnamese Super Cup: 2014, 2015

Individual
 V.League 2 top scorer: 2007

References 

1987 births
Living people
Vietnamese footballers
Association football forwards
V.League 1 players
Viettel FC players
Becamex Binh Duong FC players
Thanh Hóa FC players
People from Hanoi
Vietnam international footballers